Kraśnica may refer to the following places in Poland:
Kraśnica, Greater Poland Voivodeship
Kraśnica, Łódź Voivodeship
Kraśnica, Szczecin